Mark Sayers McGrath (born March 15, 1968) is an American singer who is the lead vocalist of the rock band Sugar Ray. McGrath is also known for his work as a co-host of Extra, and he was the host of Don't Forget the Lyrics! in 2010. McGrath hosted the second season of the TV show Killer Karaoke, taking the place of Jackass star Steve-O.

Early life 
McGrath was born in Hartford, Connecticut. His family moved from Connecticut to Newport Beach, California when he was eight years old. He attended Corona del Mar High School in Newport Beach and later the University of Southern California in Los Angeles, where he majored in communications, graduating in 1990.<ref>Q&A: Mark McGrath of Sugar Ray, Rolling Stone</ref> After college, McGrath entered a state of depression and apathy until his friend McG brought him to help in a job driving a delivery truck, where McGrath decided to continue his musical career.

Music career
McGrath, Rodney Sheppard, Murphy Karges, and Stan Frazier formed Sugar Ray in Orange County, California in 1992. In 1994 the band signed with Atlantic Records. Their first success came in 1997 with the song "Fly".

McGrath's personal popularity soared as he appeared on such national magazine covers as those of Rolling Stone and Spin. He also made numerous appearances on MTV, VH1, and various talk and awards shows. People magazine named him the "Sexiest Rocker" of 1998.

McGrath contributed the track "Reaching Out" on Strait Up, a tribute album to late vocalist James Lynn Strait, whom he has a dedication tattoo to memorialize. He appeared in the video of "Angel's Son", another song written for the album by Sevendust, and performed with the band during their appearance on The Tonight Show with Jay Leno.

In 2012, McGrath—along with Everclear's Art Alexakis—organized the SummerLand Tour, which consisted of Sugar Ray, Everclear, Lit, Marcy Playground and Gin Blossoms. McGrath and Alexakis decided to split ways in 2013, and McGrath formed the "Under the Sun Tour" with Sugar Ray, Smash Mouth, Gin Blossoms, Vertical Horizon, and Fastball.

He appeared in Smashing Pumpkins' Silvery Sometimes (Ghosts) video, released in October 2018.

He is also a DJ. He hosts a show on SiriusXM's 90s on 9 on weekends, the 120.

Television career
McGrath is a three-time champion of Rock & Roll Jeopardy! on VH1. In the finals he won against Dave Mustaine of Megadeth and Gary Dell'Abate of The Howard Stern Show. He and his band Sugar Ray performed as themselves in the 2002 Scooby-Doo movie, starring Freddie Prinze Jr. and Sarah Michelle Gellar. In 2004, he and his band performed in the series Las Vegas (Season 1, Episode 19).

In 2004, McGrath began his work as co-host of the Extra television show on September 13, after a producer had noticed his work hosting various VH1 and MTV programs, and asked him to join. McGrath left the show in July 2008 to focus on his music career. 

He served as a guest judge for American Idol auditions that were aired in early 2005. He was a guest star in a 2005 episode of Law and Order: SVU. McGrath received the part of Dex Lawson on The WB show Charmed in 2005, but he ultimately turned it down due to scheduling conflicts, and he was replaced by Jason Lewis. McGrath was the host of Pussycat Dolls Present: The Search for the Next Doll (2007) and Pussycat Dolls Present: Girlicious (2008).

In 2010, McGrath began hosting the third season of Don't Forget the Lyrics which aired on syndication. He appeared on The Celebrity Apprentice Season 4 which premiered in March 2011, where he was fired in week six and finished in tenth place.

In 2013, he appeared on Celebrity Wife Swap and the penultimate episode of The Office. McGrath continued his TV appearances in 2014 and 2015 by guest starring on The Neighbors and Workaholics. McGrath also hosted truTv's Killer Karaoke and starring in Sharknado 2: The Second One. In 2016, he appeared in the pilot episode of Lady Dynamite portraying himself.

In 2018, he was announced as one of the eleven houseguests to be competing on the first American edition of Celebrity Big Brother. He finished in third place, tied with Ariadna Gutiérrez. McGrath also appeared in the second season as a special guest.

In 2021, McGrath competed on the fifth season of The Masked Singer as the wild card contestant "Orca". Also in 2021, he became the host and narrator of the documentary television series Dark Side of the 90s.

On December 19, 2022, McGrath appeared on the first episode of the American version of “The Wheel”. He was one of the celebrities helping the contestants win money. 

Personal life
He married beautician Carin Kingsland on September 24, 2012. The couple met in 1994 and were engaged on New Year's Eve 2009 after 16 years of on-and-off dating. McGrath and Kingsland are parents to twins Lydon Edward and Hartley Grace, born on April 29, 2010.

Discography

Sugar Ray studio albums
 Lemonade and Brownies (1995)
 Floored (1997)
 14:59 (1999)
 Sugar Ray (2001)
 In the Pursuit of Leisure (2003)
 Music for Cougars (2009)
 Little Yachty (2019)

Solo EPSummertime's Coming'' (2015)

Singles
"Do It Again" (with Mike Love & John Stamos)

References

External links
 
 

1968 births
Living people
20th-century American male musicians
20th-century American singers
21st-century American male musicians
21st-century American singers
Alternative rock singers
American game show hosts
American male pop singers
American male singers
American pop rock singers
American punk rock singers
American rock singers
Big Brother (American TV series) contestants
Camp Freddy members
Musicians from Hartford, Connecticut
Musicians from Newport Beach, California
Nu metal singers
Participants in American reality television series
Singers from California
Singers from Connecticut
Sugar Ray members
The Apprentice (franchise) contestants
The Wondergirls members
USC Thornton School of Music alumni